Pierrette Fleutiaux (9 October 1941, in Guéret – 27 February 2019, in Paris) was a French writer. Her awards include the 1985 Prix Goncourt de la Nouvelle for Métamorphoses de la reine, and winner of the 1990 Prix Femina for Nous sommes éternels.

Bibliography 
 Histoire de la chauve-souris, Julliard, Paris, 1975
 Histoire du gouffre et de la lunette, Julliard/Actes Sud, Paris, 1976
 Histoire du tableau, Gallimard, Paris, 1977
 La Forteresses, Julliard, Paris, 1979
 Les Étoiles à l’envers, Actes Sud, Paris, 19xx
 Métamorphoses de la reine, Gallimard, Paris, 1985 
 Nous sommes éternels, Gallimard, Paris, 1990; English translation We Are Eternal  by Jeremy Leggett, 1994.
 Sauvée, Gallimard, Paris, 1993 
 Allons nous être heureux, Gallimard, Paris, 1994 
 Mon frère au degré X, École des loisirs, Paris, 1995
 Trini fait des vagues, Gallimard, Paris, 1997 
 La Maison des voyages (with Alain Wagneur), Gallimard, Page Blanche, 1997
 Trini à l’île de Pâques, Gallimard, Paris, 1999
 L’Expédition, Gallimard, Paris, 1999 
 Des phrases courtes, ma chérie, Actes Sud, Arles, 2001, 2003
 Le Cheval Flamme, Calmann-Levy and RMN, Paris
 Les Amants imparfaits, Actes Sud, Arles, 2005
 Les Étoiles à l'envers, New York photoroman, photographs of JS Cartier,  Actes Sud, 2006
 L’Os d'Aurochs, illustrations Christine Guinamand, Éditions du Chemin de fer, 2007
 La Saison de mon contentement, Actes Sud, Arles, 2008
 Bonjour, Anne: Chronique d'une amitié, Actes Sud, Arles, 2010
 Loli le temps venu, Odile Jacob, 2013

References 

1941 births
2019 deaths
French women novelists
People from Guéret
Prix Femina winners
Prix Goncourt de la nouvelle recipients
20th-century French novelists
20th-century French women writers